Peter Friend may refer to:

 Peter Friend (author), New Zealand science fiction author
 Peter Friend (surgeon), director of the Oxford Transplant Centre

See also
Peter's Friends